Keith McPhillamy (20 June 1882 – 3 May 1937) was an Australian cricketer. He played one first-class match for New South Wales in 1904/05.

See also
 List of New South Wales representative cricketers

References

External links
 

1882 births
1937 deaths
Australian cricketers
New South Wales cricketers
People from Bathurst, New South Wales
Cricketers from New South Wales